Joachim Clemens (October 9, 1931 – June 22, 2018) was a German politician of the Christian Democratic Union (CDU) and former member of the German Bundestag.

Life 
Clemens joined the CDU in 1967 and was a member of the Braunschweig city council from 1968 to 1980, where he was also chairman of the CDU parliamentary group from 1969 to 1980. Clemens was elected to the Bundestag in 1980 via the Lower Saxony State List. In his first term of office, he was initially a member of the Legal Affairs Committee and was a deputy member until 1994. From October 1982 to 1983 he was a deputy member of the Committee on Internal Affairs. From 1983 - in the Bundestag elections he moved into the Bundestag by a direct mandate from constituency 45 (Braunschweig) - he was a full member of the Committee on Internal Affairs, which he remained until 1994. He was also a deputy member of the Sports Committee during his first term of office until 1983 and then a full member throughout until 1994. In the 1987 and 1990 Bundestag elections, Clemens was also directly elected to the Bundestag in constituency 45, from which he finally left in 1994.

Literature

References

1931 births
2018 deaths
Members of the Bundestag for Lower Saxony
Members of the Bundestag 1990–1994
Members of the Bundestag 1987–1990
Members of the Bundestag 1983–1987
Members of the Bundestag 1980–1983
Members of the Bundestag for the Christian Democratic Union of Germany